Julia de Burgos García (February 17, 1914 – July 6, 1953) was a Puerto Rican poet. As an advocate of Puerto Rican independence, she served as Secretary General of the Daughters of Freedom, the women's branch of the Puerto Rican Nationalist Party. She was also a civil rights activist for women and African/Afro-Caribbean writers.

Early years
Julia de Burgos (birth name: Julia Constanza Burgos García) was born to Francisco Burgos Hans (a farmer) and Paula García de Burgos. Her father was a member of the Puerto Rico National Guard and had a farm near the town of Carolina, Puerto Rico, where she was born. The family later moved to the barrio of Santa Cruz of the same city. She was the oldest of thirteen children. Six of her younger siblings died of malnutrition. Her first work was Río Grande de Loíza.

After she graduated from Muñoz Rivera Primary School in 1928, her family moved to Rio Piedras where she was awarded a scholarship to attend University High School. In 1931, she enrolled in University of Puerto Rico, Rio Piedras Campus to become a teacher.

In 1933, Burgos graduated at the age of 19 from the University of Puerto Rico with a degree in teaching. She became a teacher and taught at Feijoo Elementary School in Barrio Cedro Arriba of  Naranjito, Puerto Rico. She also worked as writer for a children's program on public radio, but was reportedly fired for her political beliefs.  Among her early influences were Luis Lloréns Torres, Mercedes Negrón Muñoz a.k.a. "Clara Lair", Rafael Alberti and Pablo Neruda. According to Burgos, "My childhood was all a poem in the river, and a river in the poem of my first dreams."

Nationalism
In 1934, Burgos married Ruben Rodriguez Beauchamp and ended her teaching career. In 1936, she became a member of the Puerto Rican Nationalist Party (Partido Nacionalista de Puerto Rico), led by Pedro Albizu Campos. She was elected to the position of Secretary General of the Daughters of Freedom, the women's branch of the party. She divorced her husband in 1937.

Literature

By the early 1930s, Burgos was already a published writer in journals and newspapers. She published three books which contained a collection of her poems. For her first two books, she traveled around the island promoting herself by giving book readings.  Her third book was published posthumously in 1954. Burgos' lyrical poems are a combination of the intimate, the land and the social struggle of the oppressed.  Many critics assert that her poetry anticipated the work of feminist writers and poets as well as that of other Hispanic authors. In one of her poems, she writes: "I am life, strength, woman." Burgos received awards and recognition for her work and was celebrated by poets including Pablo Neruda, whom she met in Cuba, and stated that her calling was to be one of the greatest poet of the Americas.

Among Burgos' works are:
 
   (My Death Poem),
   (I Was My Own Path),
   (Dawn of My Silence),

Later years
Later in life, Burgos became romantically involved with Dr. Juan Isidro Jimenes Grullón, a Dominican physician. According to Grullón,  many of her poems during that time were inspired by the love that she felt for him.  In 1939, Burgos and Jimenes Grullón traveled first to Cuba where she attended briefly the University of Havana and then later to New York City where she worked as a journalist for Pueblos Hispanos, a progressive newspaper.

Shortly after their arrival in Cuba, Burgos' relationship with Jimenes Grullón began to show tension. After trying to save her relationship, she instead left and returned once again to New York, however this time alone, where she took menial jobs to support herself.  In 1943, she married Armando Marín, a musician from Vieques.  In 1947, the marriage also ended in divorce, lapsing Burgos into further depression and alcoholism.

In February 1953, she wrote one of her last poems, "Farewell in Welfare Island." It was written during her last hospitalization and is believed by her peers to be one of the only poems she wrote in English. In the poem she foreshadows her death and reveals an ever darker concept of life.

Death
On June 28, 1953, Burgos left the home of a relative in Brooklyn, where she had been residing. She disappeared without leaving a clue as to where she went.

It was later discovered that on July 6, 1953, she collapsed on a sidewalk in the Spanish Harlem section of Manhattan, and later died of pneumonia at a hospital in Harlem at the age of 39. Since no one claimed her body and she had no identification on her, the city gave her a pauper's burial on Hart Island, the city's only potter's field.

Eventually, some of her friends and relatives were able to trace her, find her grave, and claim her body. A committee was organized in Puerto Rico, presided over by Dr. Margot Arce de Vázquez, to have her remains transferred to the island. Burgos's remains arrived on September 6, 1953 and funeral services for her were held at the Puerto Rican Atheneum.  She was given a hero's burial at the Municipal Cemetery of Carolina.  A monument was later built at her burial site by the City of Carolina.

Honors
In 1986, the Spanish Department of the University of Puerto Rico posthumously honored Burgos by granting her a doctorate in Human Arts and Letters.

Cities that have honored Burgos include:
 Carolina, Puerto Rico
 Escuela Julia de Burgos
 Cleveland, Ohio
Julia De Burgos Cultural Arts Center
 New York City, New York
 Julia de Burgos Cultural Center
 Julia de Burgos Boulevard (corner of East 106th Street and Lexington Avenue)
 Julia de Burgos Middle School (M.S. 99)
 Philadelphia, Pennsylvania
 Julia de Burgos Elementary School
 Julia de Burgos Magnet Middle School
Chicago, Illinois
Julia de Burgos Park
 San Juan, Puerto Rico
 Casa Protegida Julia de Burgos (domestic violence shelter)
 Willimantic, Connecticut
 Julia de Burgos Pocket Park established by Curbstone Press

The Puerto Rican sculptor Tomás Batista sculpted a bust of de Burgos in the Julia de Burgos Park in Carolina. Isabel Cuchí Coll published a book about de Burgos titled Dos Poetisas de América: Clara Lair y Julia de Burgos. Puerto Rican poet Giannina Braschi, who was born the year of de Burgos' death, pays homage to her poetry and legend in the Spanglish novel Yo-Yo Boing!

At Yale University, the Latino Cultural Center is named in her honor, La Casa Cultural Julia de Burgos.

A documentary about the life of Burgos was made in 2002 titled "Julia, Toda en mi ... " (Julia, All in me ... ) directed and produced by Ivonne Belén. Another biopic about her life, "Vida y poesía de Julia de Burgos," was filmed and released in Puerto Rico in 1978.

In New York City, the Julia de Burgos Cultural Center, on 106th Street and Lexington Avenue, is named after her.

On September 14, 2010, in a ceremony held in San Juan, the United States Postal Service honored Burgos' life and literary work with the issuance of a first class postage stamp, the 26th release in the postal system's Literary Arts series. The stamp's portrait was created by Toronto-based artist Jody Hewgill.

In 2011, Burgos was inducted into the New York Writers Hall of Fame.

There is a plaque, located at the monument to the Jayuya Uprising participants in Mayagüez, Puerto Rico, honoring the women of the Puerto Rican Nationalist Party. Burgos' name is on the sixth line of the third plate.

On May 29, 2014, The Legislative Assembly of Puerto Rico honored 12 illustrious women with plaques in the "La Plaza en Honor a la Mujer Puertorriqueña" (Plaza in Honor of Puerto Rican Women) in San Juan. According to the plaques each of the 12 women, who by virtue of their merits and legacies, stand out in the history of Puerto Rico. Burgos was among the 12 who were honored.

In September 2017, artist-activist Molly Crabapple (herself of Puerto Rican descent) disbursed the profits of the sales of her portrait of de Burgos to the Puerto Rico Hurricane Maria Recovery Fund. The Giclee 17″ x 22″ print is captioned with one of the poet's most famous lines: "En todo me lo juego a ser lo que soy yo/I gamble everything to be what I am."

In 2018, the New York Times published a belated obituary for her.

In music
The third movement of Leonard Bernstein's Songfest: A Cycle of American Poems for Six Singers and Orchestra is a setting of Burgos' poem "A Julia de Burgos". Jack Gottlieb wrote, "In angry words (sung in Spanish) she expresses her defiance of the dual role she plays as a conventional woman and as a liberated woman-poet. (Her poem antedates by two decades the women's liberation movement.) The music is sharply rhythmic, and might well be underscoring for a bullfight."

Composer Awilda Villarini set de Burgos' work to music in her composition "Two Love Songs."

Publications
 Song of the Simple Truth: The Complete Poems of Julia de Burgos (dual-language edition: Spanish, English), trans. Jack Agueros. Curbstone Books, 1997; 
 Yo misma fui mi ruta, Ediciones Huracán, 1986; 
 Amor y soledad, Ediciones Torremozas, 1994; 
 El Mar Y Tu, Ediciones Huracan, 1981; 
 Cancion De La Verdad Sencilla (Vortice Ser), Ediciones Huracan, 1982; 
 Poema en Veinte Surcos, Ediciones Huracan, 1983; 
 Poema Río Grande de Loíza
 Poemas exactos de mí misma
 Dame tu hora perdída
  Ay, ay, ay de la grifa negra

Biographical/Documentary films
 "Julia...Todo En Mi" on the Internet Movie Database
"Vida y poesía de Julia de Burgos on the Internet Movie Database

See also

 List of Latin American writers
 List of Puerto Rican writers
 List of Puerto Ricans
 Puerto Rican literature
Multi-Ethnic Literature of the United States
Puerto Rican Nationalist Party 
History of women in Puerto Rico
Blanca Canales
Rosa Collazo 
Lolita Lebrón
Ruth Mary Reynolds 
Isabel Rosado
Isabel Freire de Matos
Isolina Rondón
Olga Viscal Garriga

References

External links

 The Complete Chronology / Cronología Completa de su vida y obra Review
 
 Julia de Burgos stamp (U.S. Postal Service site)
 Centro Journal. Special Issue on Julia de Burgos
 J'S THEATER: Poem: Julia de Burgos's "To Julia de Burgos"

1914 births
1953 deaths
People from Carolina, Puerto Rico
Puerto Rican poets
Puerto Rican women writers
Puerto Rican Nationalist Party politicians
Members of the Puerto Rican Nationalist Party
Deaths from pneumonia in New York City
20th-century Puerto Rican women politicians
20th-century Puerto Rican politicians
Puerto Rican independence activists
Puerto Rican nationalists
American women poets
20th-century American poets
20th-century American women writers
Female revolutionaries